The 2018–19 Louisville Cardinals women's basketball team represented the University of Louisville during the 2018–19 NCAA Division I women's basketball season. The Cardinals, led by 12th-year head coach Jeff Walz, played their home games at the KFC Yum! Center in their fifth year in the Atlantic Coast Conference. They finished the season 32–4, 14–2 in ACC play to win a share of the regular season title. They advanced to the championship game of the ACC women's tournament where they lost to Notre Dame. They received the at-large bid to the NCAA women's tournament as a No. 1 seed in the Albany region where they defeated Robert Morris and Michigan in the first and second rounds, Oregon State in the sweet sixteen before losing to Connecticut in the elite eight.

Previous season
The Cardinals finished the 2017–18 season at 36–3, 15–1 in ACC play to finish in a tie for first place. They won the ACC women's tournament. They received an automatic bid for the NCAA women's tournament as a number one seed. In the tournament, they advanced to the Final Four where they lost to Mississippi State.

Off-season

Recruiting Class

Source:

Roster

Rankings

Coaches did not release a Week 2 poll and AP does not release a final poll.

Schedule and results

|-
!colspan=9 style=| Regular season

|-
!colspan=9 style=| ACC Women's Tournament

|-
!colspan=9 style=| NCAA Women's Tournament

Source

References

Louisville Cardinals women's basketball seasons
Louisville
Louisville Cardinals women's basketball, 2018-19
Louisville Cardinals women's basketball, 2018-19
Louisville